David Schwartz is an American composer.

David Schwartz may also refer to:
Dave Schwartz (1953–2016), meteorologist
David Schwartz (comics), comic book writer
David Schwartz (judge) (1916–1989), judge of the United States Court of Claims
David Schwartz (lawyer) (born 1967), American attorney
David C. Schwartz (born 1939), American politician in the New Jersey General Assembly
David J. Schwartz (motivational writer) (1927–1987), American motivational writer and coach
David J. Schwartz (science fiction writer) (born 1970), American science fiction and fantasy writer

See also
David Schwarz (disambiguation)